Victoria Park is a public park in Causeway Bay, Wan Chai District, Hong Kong. The park is named after Queen Victoria, who has a statue in the park.

The park first opened to the public in October 1957 and was revamped in the early 2000s. Owned and operated by the Leisure and Cultural Services Department of Hong Kong, the park is open all year, free of admission charge. It is Hong Kong's most popular public park, with more visitors than Hong Kong and Kowloon parks combined.

Site 
Victoria Park is located on Hong Kong Island, in the Causeway Bay area of Wan Chai District. It is situated on the shore of Causeway Bay typhoon shelter and separated by a breakwater from Victoria Harbour. The park is bounded by Causeway Road to the southeast, Gloucester Road to the west, Victoria Park Road and Island Eastern Corridor to the north, and Hing Fat Street to the east.

The park is bordered on the south by the Hong Kong Central Library and the Regal Hongkong Hotel, on the east by the Park Towers residential complex, on the north by a fire station and Citicorp Centre office tower, and on the west by Windsor House retail mall and The Park Lane Hong Kong hotel. A small square, Tung Lo Wan Garden, is located in the north-western portion of Victoria Park. Two stations, Causeway Bay and Tin Hau, are located near the park. There are bus lines and a tramline along Causeway Road, which run beside the park. Several pedestrian bridges with escalators and elevators have been built to connect the park to the Causeway Road.

History 
Previously, the park's location served as a typhoon shelter, known as Causeway Bay Typhoon Shelter, used by small fishing boats and yachts during typhoon seasons. In the 1950s, the former bay was filled in, the shoreline was pushed north, and the government decided to create a public park on the newly reclaimed land. A new typhoon shelter was built north of the park.

In 1955, a statue of Queen Victoria was moved to the park. The statue was cast in Pimlico, London towards the end of the nineteenth century and subsequently erected in Hong Kong's Central District. It was transferred to Japan to be melted down during the Japanese occupation, but was retrieved in the aftermath of World War II, and was restored before being placed in the park. The park officially opened in October 1957. In 1972, embankments in the park's northern half were completed in conjunction with the construction of the Cross-Harbour Tunnel, and the Victoria Park Road was paved.

A central lawn was laid in the park in 1974 and a tennis court was built in 1981. In 1984, an overpass of the Island Eastern Corridor was built along Victoria Park Road, connecting Causeway Bay with the Tai Koo Shing estate. In September 1996, a mainland Chinese artist, Pun Sing-lui, in protest over Hong Kong's "dull, colonial culture", painted the statue of Queen Victoria crimson and bent its nose with a hammer. The nose of the statue was rebuilt costing $150,000, and Sing-lui was sentenced to 28 days in prison.

From 2000 to 2002, the park received a major renovation, which saw many sporting facilities built on the site. The park's popularity increased after the revamp, especially among Indonesian domestic workers, as Sugar Street, adjacent to the park, is home to numerous Indonesian food, spice, book, magazine and music shops.

In 2013, a modern indoor swimming complex was built on the site of the old outdoor pools. In the following year, construction work for the project began at the northern end of Victoria Park, sparking public outcry. A portion of the park was occupied by construction of a slip road for the Central–Wan Chai Bypass project. This was highly controversial, as local councillors and residents alleged they were not informed that the road would cut through the park. In March 2015, construction unearthed unexploded ordnance dating from World War II, and the Explosive Ordnance Disposal Bureau of the Hong Kong Police Force was called in to dispose of it.

Features

Facilities 

In the central section of Victoria Park, there is a complex of fourteen tennis courts, with the main court, which opened in 1981, seating approximately 3,600 spectators, with two fields with artificial turf for playing bowls are nearby. A two-hectare central lawn is surrounded by pathways with trees to the west of the tennis courts. A 625-meter jogging path around the lawn features six stops for diverse fitness training. Six public football pitches are located south of the courts and central lawn, and a sitting statue of Queen Victoria stands next to them. Four basketball courts are located in the southeast section of the park, between the football pitches and the swimming pool.

There are public roller rinks, a handball and volleyball court and table tennis courts. There are four playgrounds to the north of the tennis courts, each with its own set of slides, swings, and exercise equipment, as well as a pebble walking trail. A 954 square meter in size and a half-meter deep pond where model yachting takes place and an open stage with a bandstand suitable for a hundred spectators are both located to the north of the central lawn. Most sports fields in the park have restrooms, changing rooms, and drinking fountains. Open portions of the park are patrolled 24/7 by both local policemen and police teams.

The indoor swimming complex, which opened in September 2013 at a cost of nearly HK$800 million is located in the park's eastern section, on the location of the Old Victoria Park Swimming Pool. It includes two pools with 2,500-seat spectator stands and an electronic scoreboard, as well as changing rooms, showers, restrooms, and wheelchair lifts. The Old Victoria Park Swimming Pool was opened with the park itself in 1957 and was the first public swimming pool in Hong Kong.

Vegetation 
Trees such as Jacaranda mimosifolia, Melia azedarach, Spathodea, Delonix regia and Casuarina equisetifolia are found in the park. The park also houses many trees that are registered as "old and valuable", including Ceiba pentandra, Erythrina variegata, Mimusops elengi, Ficus virens and Ficus altissima.

Events 

In the days leading up to Chinese New Year, the park hosts the annual Lunar New Year Fair, which also includes a plant market, however both of these events were not held in 2022 due to COVID-19. Other annual events such as the Hong Kong Flower Show, Hong Kong Brands and Products Expo, Mid-Autumn Festival, Hong Kong Marathon and Hong Kong Pride Parade are also held in the park.

Apart from annual events, employees of the Consulate General of Indonesia frequently arrange meetings and open-air training courses in the park as well. The United Buddy Bears exhibition, which was held on the central lawn of Victoria Park in 2004, drew over 2 million visitors, making it Hong Kong's largest open-air art exposition. The "Arts Corner" is hosted in the South Pavilion Square every Sunday, except when there are citywide events. Here, artists sell their works, souvenirs, handicrafts, paintings, drawings, cartoons, and photographs in kiosks and small booths.

Victoria Park serves as a gathering point for the annual 1 July marches, and as a place of commemoration for the Tiananmen Square massacre of 4 June 1989, with huge crowds gathering each year to mark the anniversary of the massacre, although the park was closed in June 2021 due to law enforcement restrictions imposed, following the Hong Kong Autonomy Act. The park has become a staging ground for protests many times, including for Pro-democracy protests in December 2005, the 2014 Occupy Movement, and anti-government demonstrations in the summer of 2019.

City Forum, attended by government officials, politicians, business figurers and pundits, would debate on new government policies was formerly held at the park weekly on Sunday. The forum was inspired by Speakers' Corner in London, and was aired by Hong Kong government's broadcaster Radio Television Hong Kong. It was discontinued in September 2021.

References

Sources

Further reading

External links 

 Official website of Victoria Park
 Photo gallery of the park
 Images from commemorations of 1989 Tiananmen Square massacre in Victoria Park
 Discover Hong Kong – Victoria Park

1957 establishments in Hong Kong
Causeway Bay
Urban public parks and gardens in Hong Kong
Monuments and memorials to Queen Victoria